Night Stand with Dick Dietrick is an American television comedy show that satirized American tabloid talk shows.  The series was originally broadcast in first-run syndication from 1995 to 1997, as well as on the E! Entertainment Television network. Night Stand was co-created by Paul Abeyta, Peter Kaikko and actor/writer Timothy Stack, who also starred as the show's host Dick Dietrick. The show benefited from contributions by writer/friends of the creators, namely co-exec producer Larry Strawther (the first season show-runner) and the long-time comedy writing team of Bob Iles and Jim Stein.

History
Night Stand premiered September 16, 1995 in syndication, running in over 87% of the US markets, mainly as a Saturday evening program airing against, or if carried by an NBC station, after Saturday Night Live. It also aired on E! Monday-Thursday at 10:30 p.m. (between Talk Soup and the  Howard Stern) and was distributed internationally. The partnership with E! led to a follow up second season.

Unlike other shows, each hour-long syndicated episode was actually divided into two separate half-hour programs which yielded 96 episodes for E! reruns. (E! kept the show for several years but only in reruns.)

Much of the Night Stand production team went on to work with Howard Stern on Son of the Beach, with some of their "guests" also making appearances.

A well-received parody of tabloid talk shows, Night Stand had plenty of funny scenes, but one scene unexpectedly went too far when Dietrick (Timothy Stack) tore the clothes off a male model named Kal (played by Kevin Light) to see if he could impress a seemingly uninterested young woman guest, Gloria Holt (played by Beth Tegarden) looking for dates in the episode "Love on the Internet," produced in 1995.  After ripping off his shirt, the model's trousers were next, but Stack accidentally pulled Kal's underwear down as well; as a result, there was a brief (and unscripted) glimpse of male genitalia, much to the shared shock of the audience and the performers. This scene has sometimes turned up on outtake and blooper programs such as It'll be Alright on the Night.

Night Stand was the first production from Big Ticket Productions, the company formed by former Warner Bros. development executive Larry Lyttle.  Strawther had worked with Abeyta and Kaikko at Merv Griffin Productions and later worked with Lyttle on the shows "My Sister Sam" and "Night Court."  Strawther brought on Night Court director Jim Drake and they developed the tape-four-shows-a-week format that made the show financially practical. Strawther did not return as show-runner for the second season after he and Stack differed on when silliness went "over the top."

The show's original slogan "If you don't have Nightstand, you don't have Dick" and The Comedy That Makes Up Talk was later changed to The Comedy That Makes Fun of Talk.

Night Stand helped Big Ticket Productions get started.  They did even better on its next project, "Judge Judy."  The show's original publicist was Howard Bragman, who is now considered one of Hollywood's top publicists.

Produced: 1995–1999 (96 episodes, 2 shows per syndicated episode)

Cast

Main
Timothy Stack as Dick Dietrick
Peter Siragusa as Miller, Dick's long-suffering assistant on the show. Beginning in season 2, the role was taken over by Robert Alan Beuth and the character renamed "Mueller".
Lynne Marie Stewart as Audience member (the lady in the frumpy dress with the glasses)

Recurring guests
Christopher Darga as Bob, a frequent guest involved in various exploitative and depraved endeavors.  When confronted by Dietrick, he would inevitably offer the unconvincing excuse, "I'm sick. I need help."  Darga and Vic Wilson (who also auditioned for the role of Bob) were well-remembered by Abeyta, Kaikko and Strawther who cast them as announcers Vic Romano and Kenny Blankenship a few years later on their cult hit, "Most Extreme Elimination Challenge (MXC)."
Tim Silva as Dr. Lonnie Lanier, psychologist and expert. Like Stack himself, Silva was one of the many Groundlings graduates who appeared on the show.
Steve Valentine as 'The Astounding Andy', hypnotist and magician

Guest stars
Morgan Fairchild as Morgan Fairchild impersonator/herself
Phil Hartman as Gunther Johann
Rodney Dangerfield as himself (a clip of Rodney's movie "Meet Wally Sparks" is shown)
Garry Marshall as himself trying to promote his book "Wake Me When It's Funny" while Dick was not too subtly trying to pitch a new action show "Arctic Heat."   
Mancow Muller as Mancow ('Eurotrash')
Jerry Springer as himself
Harry Anderson as himself
Jimmie Walker as himself; in one episode he becomes the new host of "Night Stand Lite!", a Letterman-esque talk show parody that "replaces" Dick's show

References

"Glued to the tube. Stacking up against reality of TV talk shows"  Newsday 11/21/1995

External links

1990s American satirical television series
1995 American television series debuts
1997 American television series endings
English-language television shows
E! original programming
First-run syndicated television programs in the United States
Television series about television
Television series by CBS Studios